The following is a list of Chicago Cubs broadcasters:

Names in bold are recipients of the Ford C. Frick Award, presented annually by the National Baseball Hall of Fame to a broadcaster for major contributions to baseball.

1920s-1940s
Hal Totten (1924–44)
Bob Elson (1928–41) 
Pat Flanagan (1929–43)
Ronald Reagan (1933–36)
Russ Hodges (1935–38)
Jimmy Dudley (1938–41)
Jack Drees (1938)
Charlie Grimm (1939–42; 1960)
Jack Brickhouse (1941–45; 1947–81) "Hey-hey!" "Weeeeee!"
Bert Wilson (1944–55) "I don't care who wins, as long as it's the Cubs!"
Wayne Osborne (1945)
Joe Wilson (1946–52)
Bill Brundige (1949)
Rogers Hornsby (1949)

1950s-1970s
Bud Campbell (1950–53)
Harry Creighton (1951–56)
Gene Elston (1954)
Vince Lloyd (1954–86) "Holy mackerel!"
Milo Hamilton (1955–57; 1980–84) "Holy Toledo!!"
Jack Quinlan (1956–64)
Lou Boudreau (1958–59; 1961–87) "Kiss it goodbye!"
Lloyd Pettit (1963; 1965–1966; 1969–1970)
Jim West (1971-1976)

1980s-1990s
Harry Caray (1982–97) "It might be... it could be... it is!" "Holy cow!" "Cubs win!"
 In 1987, Caray suffered a stroke during the offseason leading to his absence from the broadcast booth for most of the first two months of the season. To fill the void, a series of celebrity guest announcers appeared on the WGN telecasts in his place.
Steve Stone (1983–2000; 2003–2004)
Dan Roan (1984–2019); substitute broadcaster and host of certain specials; WGN only
Dewayne Staats (1985–89)
Jim Frey (1987)
Dave Nelson (1988–89)
Ron Santo (1990–2010) "Boy, oh boy..."
Bob Brenly (1990–91 radio; 2005–2012 TV)
Thom Brennaman (1990–95)
Pat Hughes (1996–present); radio play-by-play; "This ball's got a chaaaance...GONE!" "Get out the tape measure, LONG gone!"
Josh Lewin (1997)
Chip Caray (1998–2004) "Swung on and belted!" "Fisted!"
Andy Masur (1999–2006); secondary play-by-play and pre-post game host

2000s-2020s
Joe Carter (2001–2002) "Like a deer with headlights!"
Dave Otto  (2001–2002) "You gotta be some kind of strong..."
Len Kasper (2005–2020) "Way back! It's outta here!" "They've gone back-to-back!" "Oh, baby!"
Dan Plesac (2005–2008); substitute broadcaster; CSN Chicago only
Cory Provus (2007–2008); secondary play-by-play and pre-post game host
Judd Sirott (2009–2014); secondary play-by-play and pre-post game host
Keith Moreland (2011–2013)
Jim Deshaies (2013–present); color commentator
Ron Coomer (2014–present); radio color commentator
Doug Glanville (2014–2019); substitute color commentator
Mark Grote (2015–2017); pre-post game host; substitute play-by-play
Zach Zaidman (2018–present); pre-post game host
Ryan Dempster (2020–present); substitute color commentator
Mark Grace (2020); substitute color commentator
Sean Marshall (2020); substitute color commentator
Jon Sciambi (2021–present); play-by-play
Chris Myers (2021–present); substitute play-by-play
Beth Mowins (2021–present); substitute play-by-play, first woman to broadcast a Cub game
Ryne Sandberg (2021–present); substitute color commentator
Rick Sutcliffe (2021–present); substitute color commentator
Matt Spiegel (2021–present); substitute play-by-play and pre-post game host
Joe Girardi (2022–present); substitute color commentator

References

 
Lists of Major League Baseball broadcasters
Fox Sports Networks
NBC Sports Regional Networks
Bally Sports
CBS Radio Sports
Broadcasters